Pilsen is an unincorporated community in the town of Montpelier, in Kewaunee County, Wisconsin, United States. It is located on Wisconsin Highway 29.

Notes

Unincorporated communities in Kewaunee County, Wisconsin
Unincorporated communities in Wisconsin
Czech-American culture in Wisconsin